Clarence John "Pike" Kenney (January 13, 1882 – November 28, 1950) was an American college football player and coach. He played college football at Marquette University before transferring as a medical student to the University of Saint Louis. Kenney was an outstanding halfback and captain of the 1906 Saint Louis Blue and White football team when his teammate, Bradbury Robinson, completed the first legal forward pass to Jack Schneider in the history of American football on September 5 against  in Waukesha, Wisconsin. Kenney served as head football coach at Creighton University in 1908, where his team went 3–3–2. He returned to Marquette in 1910 as an assistant coach and served as the head football coach there for one season in 1912, compiling a record of 3–4.

A native of Cedarburg, Wisconsin, Kenney served during World War I as a medical major in the 32nd Division of the United States Army. He died on November 28, 1950, in Houma, Louisiana, following a long illness.

Head coaching record

References

External links
 

1882 births
1950 deaths
American football halfbacks
Creighton Bluejays football coaches
Marquette Golden Avalanche football coaches
Marquette Golden Avalanche football players
Saint Louis Billikens football players
College men's track and field athletes in the United States
United States Army personnel of World War I
United States Army officers
People from Cedarburg, Wisconsin
People from Mequon, Wisconsin
Players of American football from Wisconsin
Military personnel from Wisconsin